Mouhers is a commune in the Indre department in central France.

Geography
The Bouzanne forms the commune's southwestern border, then flows northeast through the western part of the commune.

Population

See also
Communes of the Indre department

References

Communes of Indre